Zoltan Farmati (9 July 1924 – 3 January 2006) was a Romanian association football defender. Between 1947 and 1953 he played 21 matches for the national team, including one at the 1952 Summer Olympics. Domestically he mostly stayed with UTA Arad, winning with them the national title in 1947–1948, 1950 and 1954.

Honours
UTA Arad
Liga I: 1947–48, 1950, 1954 
Cupa României: 1947–48, 1953

References

1924 births
2006 deaths
People from Șimleu Silvaniei
Romanian footballers
Romania international footballers
Romanian sportspeople of Hungarian descent
Olympic footballers of Romania
Footballers at the 1952 Summer Olympics
Liga I players
FC UTA Arad players
Association football defenders